Miss Universe Ghana, whose slogan is Ghana's Next Sweetheart, is a national pageant that sends representatives to the Miss Universe pageant. This pageant is unrelated to Miss Ghana or Miss Earth Ghana pageant. The current Miss Universe Ghana is Engracia Mofuman, who was crowned on December 21, 2021 in Accra, Ghana.

History

1991–1998
Miss Ghana Organization franchised Miss Universe for Miss Ghana winner between 1991 and 1998.

1999–2015
Miss Universe Ghana was handled by R. Ayite Okyne took over the event directing and show production and Luiz Delaja (Jimi delaja) as creative director eventually joined Juliette Korsah then National Director for the Miss Universe Ghana pageant. They relinquished the franchise in 2012 and are no longer involved in its operations. The highest achievement of Ghana is Miss Universe Ghana 1999 Akuba Cudjoe who placed as the Top 10 Finalist at the Miss Universe 1999.

2017–present
In May 2017, Menaye Donkor (Miss Universe Ghana 2004) was appointed to be the new Miss Universe Ghana national director and Malz Productions.

In July 2019. Donkor announced that the Miss Universe Ghana organization is suspended while the restructuring of the organization continues. Therefore, Ghana will withdraw from the Miss Universe 2019. Operations will resume in 2020.

Titleholders

Miss Universe Ghana

On occasion, when the winner does not qualify (due to age) for either contest, a runner-up is sent.

Miss Ghana 1991-1998

Wins by region

References

External links
 www.missuniverseghanaorg.com

Ghana
Beauty pageants in Ghana
Recurring events established in 1999
Ghanaian awards